The 2016–17 Georgia State Panthers men's basketball team represented Georgia State University during the 2016–17 NCAA Division I men's basketball season. The team's head coach was Ron Hunter who was in his sixth season at Georgia State. The Panthers played their home games at the GSU Sports Arena in Atlanta as members of the Sun Belt Conference. They finished the season 20–13, 12–6 in Sun Belt play to finish in second place. They defeated Louisiana–Lafayette in the quarterfinals of the Sun Belt tournament to advance to the semifinals where they lost to Troy. They were invited to the CollegeInsider.com Tournament where they lost in the first round to Texas A&M–Corpus Christi.

Previous season 
The Panthers finished the 2015–16 season 16–14, 9–11 in Sun Belt play to finish in sixth place. They lost in the first round of the Sun Belt tournament to Texas State.

Off-season
After the end of the 2015–16 season, work was completed on the new GSU Practice Facility, an indoor gym complete with six courts. This addition was mandated by head coach Ron Hunter after the March Madness run in 2015.

Assistant coach Everick Sullivan was hired by Lenoir-Rhyne University to serve as head basketball coach after coaching the Panthers for five seasons.

Shortly afterwards, Sharman White, the head basketball coach of Metro Atlanta high school Miller Grove was hired after winning his team seven state titles in his last eight seasons. He set a state record with six titles in a row (2009–14). Among his coaching recognitions, White has been awarded the Naismith Atlanta Tip-Off Club Bobby Cremins Award, named the USA Today National Coach Of The Year, and was most recently named the National High School Coaches Association (NHSCA) Coach Of The Year. Before joining the Georgia State staff, White compiled a 373–86 career coaching record over a 19-year career.

Another assistant coach, Daryl LaBarrie, also left the Panthers to work as assistant coach at his alma mater, Georgia Tech. He was eventually replaced by former Detroit head coach Ray McCallum.

Departures

Incoming Transfers

Recruiting class

Roster

Schedule and results

|-
!colspan=9 style=| Exhibition

|-
!colspan=9 style=| Non-conference regular season

|-
!colspan=9 style=| Sun Belt Conference regular season

|-
!colspan=9 style=| Sun Belt tournament

|-
!colspan=9 style=| CIT

References

Georgia State Panthers men's basketball seasons
Georgia State
Georgia State
2016 in sports in Georgia (U.S. state)
2017 in sports in Georgia (U.S. state)